Timothy Kelly is currently Assistant General Counsel for Hall of Fame Resort and Entertainment Company (Hall of Fame Village). Prior to this he worked as Business Affairs Executive at William Morris Endeavor in their sports division. Early in his career Kelly also served as the General Manager for the Long Island Lizards of Major League Lacrosse, the Chief Operating Officer of the New York Titans of the National Lacrosse League, and the New York Dragons of the Arena Football League  He is a 2002 graduate of Brown University in Providence, Rhode Island, and a 2005 graduate of Brooklyn Law School in Brooklyn, New York.

References

Brooklyn Law School alumni
Brown University alumni
Living people
American chief operating officers
American sports executives and administrators
Year of birth missing (living people)